Carlos Xabier 'Xabi' Pascual Luca de Tena (born 9 July 1981) is a Spanish footballer who plays for Argentine club Deportivo Español as a goalkeeper.

Football career
Pascual was born in Bilbao, Biscay. During his career, spent almost exclusively in the lower leagues, he represented CD Basconia (Athletic Bilbao's third team), Arenas Club de Getxo, CA Osasuna B, Amurrio Club, Racing de Santander – no competitive appearances for the La Liga club, playing exclusively for the B-team – Real Oviedo, Barakaldo CF and Gimnàstic de Tarragona.

Pascual made his debut at the professional level on 14 June 2009, one month shy of his 28th birthday, keeping a clean sheet for Gimnàstic in a 2–0 home win against Elche CF in the Segunda División. He appeared in only two more matches in that level during his career, also with the Catalans.

In 2012, after two years without a club, Pascual moved to Argentina, going on to spend several seasons in the country's lower divisions.

References

External links

1981 births
Living people
Spanish footballers
Footballers from Bilbao
Association football goalkeepers
Segunda División players
Segunda División B players
Tercera División players
CD Basconia footballers
Arenas Club de Getxo footballers
CA Osasuna B players
Racing de Santander players
Real Oviedo players
Rayo Cantabria players
Barakaldo CF footballers
Gimnàstic de Tarragona footballers
Deportivo Español footballers
Spanish expatriate footballers
Expatriate footballers in Argentina
Spanish expatriate sportspeople in Argentina
Athletic Bilbao footballers